Rebrișoara is a commune in Bistrița-Năsăud County, Transylvania, Romania. It is composed of four villages: Gersa I, Gersa II (both Gertia), Poderei (Szamosontuli) and Rebrișoara. The existence of the main village was first mentioned in 1440.

References

Communes in Bistrița-Năsăud County
Localities in Transylvania